The 2016 Cornell Big Red football team represented Cornell University in the 2016 NCAA Division I FCS football season as a member of the Ivy League. They were led by fourth-year head coach David Archer and play their home games at Schoellkopf Field. Cornell finished the season 4–6 overall and 2–5 in Ivy League play to tie for sixth place.

Schedule
The 2016 schedule consisted of five home and five away games. The Big Red hosted Ivy League foes Yale, Princeton, Dartmouth and Penn, and traveled to Harvard, Brown, and Columbia.

As in 2015, Cornell's non-conference opponents were Bucknell and Colgate of the Patriot League, and Sacred Heart of the Northeast Conference (NEC). Homecoming coincided with the home opener against Yale on September 24.

Game summaries

Bucknell

Yale

Colgate

Harvard

Sacred Heart

Brown

Princeton

Dartmouth

Columbia

Penn

References

Cornell
Cornell Big Red football seasons
Cornell Big Red football